The 2015 KML Playoffs was the final phase of the 2014–15 KML season. The playoffs began on 7 April and ended on 22 May. The tournament concluded with TÜ/Rock defeating Kalev/Cramo 4 games to 1 in the finals. Tanel Kurbas was named KML Finals MVP.

Bracket

Quarter-finals
The quarter-finals are best-of-5 series.

TÜ/Rock vs. TLÜ/Kalev

Kalev/Cramo vs. TTÜ

TYCO Rapla vs. Valga/Maks & Moorits

Rakvere Tarvas vs. Pärnu

Semi-finals
The quarter-finals are best-of-5 series.

TÜ/Rock vs. Rakvere Tarvas

Kalev/Cramo vs. TYCO Rapla

Third place games
The finals are best-of-3 series.

TYCO Rapla vs. Rakvere Tarvas

Finals
The finals are best-of-7 series.

TÜ/Rock vs. Kalev/Cramo

References

External links
 Official Site 

Korvpalli Meistriliiga playoffs
playoffs